Street of Lost Brothers is an album by Gary Lucas. It was released on October 24, 2000, through Tzadik Records.

Track listing

Personnel 
Musicians
Ernie Brooks – bass guitar
Jason Candler – bass guitar, engineering
Peter Eng – bass guitar
Larry Fine – vocals
Hank Frisch – harmonica
Jesper Gadeliu – guitar
Walter Horn – piano, sampler, synthesizer
Kenny Hurwitz – vocals
Jonathan Kane – drums
Kenny – vocals
Gary Lucas – vocals, acoustic guitar, electric guitar, slide guitar, steel guitar, production, engineering
Aldo Tsang – drums
John Zorn – alto saxophone
Production and additional personnel
Heung-Heung "Chippy" Chin – design
Hendrik Leitmann – photography
Rob McCabe – engineering
Andreas Neumann-Nochten – illustrations
Tim Powell – engineering
Allan Tucker – mastering
Arjen Veldt – photography

References 

 

2000 albums
Gary Lucas albums
Tzadik Records albums